The IRB International Sevens Team of the Year was awarded by the International Rugby Board in the November or December each year from 2002 to 2007. In 2002 and 2003, the award was called the IRB Sevens Team of the Year.

List of winners
 2002: 
 2003: 
 2004: 
 2005: 
 2006: 
 2007:

List of other IRB awards 
 IRB International Player of the Year
 IRB International Team of the Year 
 IRB International Coach of the Year 
 IRB International U19 Player of the Year
 IRB International U21 Player of the Year
 IRB International Sevens Player of the Year
 Spirit of Rugby Award 
 Vernon Pugh Award for Distinguished Service 
 IRB Referee Award for Distinguished Service 
 IRB International Women's Personality of the Year  
 IRB Development Award 
 IRB Chairman's Award

External links
 Past winners

Team
IRB Award